The Jilin Northeast Tigers or Jilin Tonggang, Jilin Tonggang Northeast Tigers or Jiutai Rural Commercial Bank are a professional basketball team based in Changchun, Jilin, China, which plays in the North Division of the Chinese Basketball Association. The Tonggang Group is the club's corporate sponsor while its mascot is a Siberian tiger.

History
The team was founded in 1956 but became a professional club in 1998. It was known as Jilin Henghe in the 2000–01 CBA season, Jilin Jiliang in the 2001–02 CBA season, and Jilin Yiqi in the 2002–03 CBA season. The multiple name changes reflect the annual turnover in corporate sponsorship that characterized this era.

During the 2004–05 CBA season, the Jilin Northeast Tigers finished in fourth place in the CBA's North Division, but lost in the Quarter-Finals of the CBA Playoffs to the defending champions, the South Division's Guangdong Southern Tigers.

In the 2005–06 CBA season, they posted the same finish, and ultimately suffered exactly the same fate. This was the third year in a row, in fact, that the Northeast Tigers were eliminated from the CBA Playoffs by the Southern Tigers.

Roster

Notable players

Current
  Cui Jinmin (2013–)
  Dominique Jones (2018–)

Former

  Sun Jun (1994–2005)
  Xue Yuyang (2001–2003)
  David Vanterpool (1997–1999)
  Marcus Session (2004)
  Babacar Camara (2005–2008)
  Leon Rodgers (2008–2010, 2013)
  Dewarick Spencer (2012–2013)
  Denzel Bowles (2013–2015)
  Michel Madanly (2014–2015)
  Marcus Williams (2015–2016)
  Peter John Ramos (2015–2016)
  Josh Akognon (2015–2016)
  Bob Donewald, Jr. (Head coach, 2016–2017)
  Jabari Brown (2016–2017)
  Malcolm Thomas (2016–2017)
  Mehdi Kamrani (2016–2017)
  Von Wafer (2018–2019)
  Carl Landry (2018–2019)
  Maciej Lampe (2018–2019)
  Alex Poythress

External links
 Official website 
 Team profile 

Chinese Basketball Association teams
Sport in Changchun
Basketball teams established in 1956
1956 establishments in China